Jaime Andrés Bellolio Avaria (born 29 November 1980) is a Chilean engineer and politician, militant from Unión Demócrata Independiente (UDI). He served as deputy of the Republic from March 2014 to 2020. He also has served as Minister Secretary General of the Government during the second government of Sebastián Piñera (2018–2022).

He began his parliamentary career aged 34 being elected as a deputy for the then 30th district of the Metropolitan Region of Santiago. Previously, he was president of the Students Federation of the Catholic University of Chile (FEUC; 2002–2003).

References

External Links
 

1980 births
Living people
Chilean people
Pontifical Catholic University of Chile alumni
21st-century Chilean politicians
Independent Democratic Union politicians
Chilean Ministers Secretary General of Government